Journey Inwards is the first studio album by British drum and bass artist LTJ Bukem. It was released on Bukem's own record label, Good Looking Records, in 2000. It peaked at number 40 on the UK Albums Chart.

Critical reception

John Bush of AllMusic said, "Taken as a whole, Journey Inwards is an album of pure brilliance, a work that trumps many of Bukem's past productions, and signals, for what may be the first time, that his production talents are actually growing and developing. " Prasad Bidaye of Exclaim! described the album as "a simple but sophisticated expression of warmth, optimistic, and still danceable, sensibilities."

Track listing

Personnel
Credits adapted from liner notes.

 D. Williamson – keyboards (A7), production
 A. Hamil – bass guitar (A1, B1)
 A. Ross – flute (A1, B1, B3, B4, B6), saxophone (A2, B1, B6)
 S. Vispi – electronics (A1), mixing (A4–B1, B3–B5, B7), additional mixing (A3, B2, B6)
 O. Lomax – mixing (A1)
 D. Duncan – mixing (A2, A3, B2, B6)
 M. Holmes – voice (A4)
 S. Holmes – voice (A4) 
 D. Holmes – voice (A4)
 L. King – voice (A4)
 J. King – voice (A4)
 G. Westerhoff – cello (A6, A7)
 Elliot – vocals (B1)
 C. Campbell – guitar (B1)
 N. Purser – artwork

Charts

References

External links
 

2000 debut albums
LTJ Bukem albums